John J. Allen Jr. is a United States Air Force major general who serves as the commander of the Air Force Installation and Mission Support Center. He previously commanded the Air Force Civil Engineer Center.

References

External links

Year of birth missing (living people)
Living people
Place of birth missing (living people)
United States Air Force generals